Romain Baubry (born January 28, 1989) is a French police officer and politician of the National Rally. In 2022, he was elected as a deputy for Bouches-du-Rhône's 15th constituency.

Baubry was born in Normandy and later moved to Bouches-du-Rhône with his family. His parents both run a floristry business. Baubry was a prison guard for five years before working for the National Gendarmerie in Nîmes and then as an officer of the National Police in Cavaillon and in the Vaucluse.

During the 2022 French legislative election, Baubry was elected to the National Assembly for the 15th constituency of Bouches-du-Rhône. He has cited national security concerns as one of his reasons for getting involved in politics.

References

1989 births
Living people
Deputies of the 16th National Assembly of the French Fifth Republic
French police officers
National Rally (France) politicians
People from Mont-Saint-Aignan